Lizzie M. Gannon was an alleged teenage mystic and stigmatic from Boston, Massachusetts. She claimed to see visions of the Blessed Virgin Mary, saints, and her dead brother.

"Angels" lawsuit
In 1881, Gannon's parents sued Fr. John H. Fleming and Archbishop John Joseph Williams for $5,000 in Suffolk Superior Court.  Three years prior, Gannon began going into trances, during which should could not speak unless Fleming or a few others placed their hands on her. When she came out of them, she claimed to have  received revelations from the Virgin Mary and to have seen saints and the faces of those who died.

Her family sent for Fleming, their parish priest, in the fall of 1878. Fleming would often attend to the girl, often in the company of another priest, and the visits seemed to help her. In one of her revelations, Gannon said that the Virgin Mary had a message for Fleming, that he was to write a book that told Gannon's story and of all of her visions. Fleming declined to write the book.

In the fall of 1879, Fleming visited the girl, who was entranced and holding in her hands two or three images or dolls of angels. They were about .75 inches long and appeared to be cut from heavy paper. Gannon said the images had been given to her by her dead brother. Her brother, to whom she had been quite attached, had died two years prior. She also claimed to have received several other items from angels or spirits, including a letter written by the Virgin Mary. Fleming persuaded the girl to give the images to him.

During his visits, Fleming called in doctors and others to see if they could help the girl and she was diagnosed with hysteria by Dr. Hodges. A Dr. Porter suggested Gannon be sent to a hospital. Over time Fleming came to believe the girl was faking, and so stopped visiting around Christmas in 1880. Gannon's father tried to persuade Fleming to continuing visiting the girl. When he was unsuccessful in that, almost a year after she had given up the dolls, he asked for their return. Fleming told her father that he lost them. Gannon's father then appealed to Archbishop John Joseph Williams but the bishop sided with the priest.

When the suit was brought in the summer of 1881, the girl reportedly had hardly spoken for a year. She was bedridden and could not see or speak, according to her lawyers. Other testified that they had seen her doing work around the home, out shopping with her mother in the neighborhood, and even speaking. Her parents contended that her condition was brought about by the loss of the images. Others contended that the suit was brought when Fleming refused to help the girl and her family seek publicity. Before the case went to trial, Gannon's father published a book about his daughter.

The jury found for Gannon and awarded damages of $0.01.

Notes

References

Stigmatics
Marian visionaries
People from Boston
Year of birth missing
Year of death missing